Louis Americo Polli (July 9, 1901 – December 19, 2000), nicknamed "Crip", was a professional baseball relief pitcher. 

Polli first played in the majors with the St. Louis Browns in 1932, pitching 6 innings with a 5.40 earned run average. 

Polli would not play again in the major leagues until 1944, a period of 12 seasons, when he pitched 35 innings for the New York Giants, with a 4.54 earned run average. Polli's MLB career ERA was 4.68.

One of the greatest pitchers in minor-league history, the lanky righthander was the first major league player born in Italy, being one of only seven Italian-born players in MLB as of 2017. Polli compiled a career minor league lifetime mark of 236–226 through 22 seasons.

At the time of his death in 2000, aged 99, Polli was the oldest living former MLB player.

References

External links

1901 births
2000 deaths
Chattanooga Lookouts players
Harrisburg Senators players
Italian emigrants to the United States
Jacksonville Tars players
Knoxville Smokies players
Louisville Colonels (minor league) players
Major League Baseball pitchers
Major League Baseball players from Italy
Milwaukee Brewers (minor league) players
Montreal Royals players
Nashua Millionaires players
Jersey City Giants players
New York Giants (NL) players
St. Louis Browns players
St. Paul Saints (AA) players